The 2017 Boys' Youth European Volleyball Championship was played in Slovakia and Hungary from 22 to 30 April 2017. The top six teams qualified for the 2017 Youth World Championship.

Participating teams
 Hosts
 
 
 Qualified through 2017 Boys' Youth European Volleyball Championship Qualification

Pools composition

Preliminary round

Pool I
Venue:  Győr, Hungary

|}

|}

Pool II
Venue:  Púchov, Slovakia

|}

|}

Final round

5th–8th place

5th–8th semifinals

|}

7th place match

|}

5th place match

|}

Final

Semifinals

|}

3rd place match

|}

Final

|}

Final standing

Awards
At the conclusion of the tournament, the following players were selected as the tournament dream team.

Most Valuable Player
  Adis Lagumdzija
Best Setter
  Ondřej Piskáček
Best Outside Spikers
  Batuhan Avci
  Davide Gardini

Best Middle Blockers
  Lorenzo Cortesia
  Vitalii Dikarev
Best Opposite Spiker
  Marek Šotola
Best Libero
  Filippo Federici

References

External links
Official website

Boys' Youth European Volleyball Championship
European Boys' Youth Championship
Volleyball
Volleyball
International volleyball competitions hosted by Hungary
International volleyball competitions hosted by Slovakia
Sport in Győr
April 2017 sports events in Europe